Henry Pearce may refer to:

Henry Pearce (cricketer) (1886–1936), American cricketer
George Pearce (Queensland politician) (Henry George Pearce, 1917–1992), Australian politician
Bobby Pearce (rower) (Henry Robert Pearce, 1905–1976), Australian Olympic gold medalist rower
Hen Pearce (1777–1809), boxer

See also
Henry Pierce (disambiguation)